The Cowley Carol Book was edited by George Ratcliffe Woodward and was published in 1901 and 1919, in two parts, ('First' and 'Second' Series), and was subtitled as a selection of carols "for Christmas, Easter and Ascensiontide".

The First Series was produced by George Ratcliffe Woodward, and for the second, later volume he was assisted by Charles Wood.

The 'First Series' (1901, revised 1902) contained 39 carols, some already published in J. M. Neale and T. Helmore's "Carols for Christmas-tide, 1853 and Carols for Easter-tide, 1854" The second edition of the first volume (1902) had 65 carols – 42 for Christmas and Epiphany, 20 for Easter and 3 for Ascensiontide.

The Second Series with 37 carols was delayed by World War I, until 1919. 27 carols are for Christmas and Epiphany, two for Passion-tide and nine for Easter and Ascension.  Charles Wood co-edited this second volume.

The origin of the title lies in a request for a carol book from the parish of St John, Cowley. The Church was the home of the Society of St John the Evangelist, also known as the 'Cowley Fathers'. A third of the texts are by John Mason Neale, and the rest by Thomas Helmore and Woodward himself. Woodward harmonised almost half of the items in Series I, but only of four of those in Series II. 'Up! Good Christen Folk and Listen' and 'Come rock the cradle for Him' made their first appearances in the book. There are many translations, from German, Latin and Greek included, and some are macaronic, that is, involving more than one language in a text..

Strictly speaking, St Mary and St John Cowley was/is not the home of SSJE. Fr Richard Benson was one of the three Founders of the Society while he was Incumbent at the Parish Church. Fr Benson is credited as being the instigator of the Society. He was a great encourager of good monastic and parish music.

The attractive 1927 edition of both volumes published by A. R. Mowbray & Co. Ltd. is printed on heavy deckle edge paper. The card jacket is greyish green with dark green print and a red "C" serving as the "C" for both the word "Cowley" and, below it, the word "Carol". A red fleur de lis decorates the bottom right corner of the cover.

See also
 List of Christmas carols

External links 
1922 edition digitized by Richard Mammana

Anglican church music
Christmas carol collections
Music books
1901 books
1919 books
1901 in Christianity
Anglican liturgical books